The Ottawa Jr. Canadians are a Canadian Junior ice hockey team from Ottawa, Ontario, Canada.  They formerly played in the Eastern Ontario Junior Hockey League of the Ottawa District Hockey Association.

Between 2014-15 and the end of the 2019-2020 seasons, the EOJHL and the CCHL set a new agreement  in an attempt to create a better player development model. This resulted in the league re-branding itself as the Central Canada Hockey League Tier 2 (CCHL2), and shrinking to 16 teams and two divisions. The league reverted to the Eastern Ontario Junior Hockey League for 2021. The Canadians are in the Martin Division.

Season-by-season results

External links
Ottawa Canadians Official Website
League Webpage

Eastern Ontario Junior B Hockey League teams
Jun
Ice hockey clubs established in 1973
1973 establishments in Ontario